Mautes is a commune in the Creuse department in the Nouvelle-Aquitaine region in central France.

Geography

Population

Sights
 The church, dating from the thirteenth century.
 The feudal castles at Barmont and Puy-de-Barmont.
 Traces of Roman villas.
 A menhir.

See also
Communes of the Creuse department

References

Communes of Creuse